Wrestling was one of the sports which was held at the 1954 Asian Games in Manila, Philippines between 1 and 3 May 1954. The competition included only men's freestyle events.

Medalists

Medal table

Participating nations
A total of 32 athletes from 8 nations competed in wrestling at the 1954 Asian Games:

References
 www.fila-wrestling.com
 The Straits Times, 4 May 1954, Page 14

 
1954 Asian Games events
1954
Asian Games
1954 Asian Games